Kalaiharasan a/l Letchumanan (born 17 March 1996) is a Malaysian professional footballer who plays as a defender for Malaysia Super League club Sarawak United.

Career

Club
Kalaiharasan began with Negeri Sembilan. He was moved into the club's senior team for the 2018 Malaysia Super League. His professional debut arrived on 3 February in the Super League, he played the full ninety minutes of a 1–0 loss to PKNP.

International
In June 2017, Kalaiharasan was called up by the Malaysia U22s for AFC qualification in Thailand.

Career statistics
.

References

External links

1996 births
Living people
Place of birth missing (living people)
Malaysian footballers
Association football defenders
Malaysia Super League players
Negeri Sembilan FA players